Tom Moore (April 14, 1914 in Berkeley, California – May 10, 2002) was a National Track and Field Hall of Fame track and field promoter, known for his decades of service as meet director of the Modesto Relays.

As a hurdler for the University of California, Moore tied the world record in the 120 yard high hurdles (the Imperial distance equivalent to the 110 metre hurdles) at 14.2.  Prior to running a Berkeley, he had run for Sacramento City College where he was coached by L.D. Weldon and at Petaluma High School.  Both became early members of that institution's Hall of Fame.  He was the 1935 United States Champion in the 400 metres hurdles.  Sports Illustrated shows a picture of him in Milan, Italy during the 1935 European season, helping carry injured sprinting prodigy Eulace Peacock off the track.

Moore competed for the Olympic Club in the high hurdles and 220 yard hurdles into the 1940s. Toward the end of his running career in 1942, he was asked to help with a start up track and field event at Modesto Junior College.   Moore served as the starter for the first meet for all but one race . . . the high hurdles, which he won.  He had his running shorts on under his uniform and hastily changed to run.  He gained a reputation as a top track and field official.

For most of its 67-year run in Modesto Moore's name would go on to become synonymous with the event called the Modesto Relays.  Moore did almost everything else to make the meet what it became, from attracting top name talent to adjusting the lights toward the track (rather than just the football field).  Moore found sponsorship from S&W Foods that brought notoriety to the otherwise sleepy Central Valley town.  When S&W dropped its sponsorship in 1994, Moore found a new sponsor in Coca-Cola.

At that first meet in 1942, "Dutch" Warmerdam set a world record in the pole vault with a bamboo pole.  More than a decade later, Double Olympic Gold medalist, Bob Richards negotiated a $75 cash bonus, if he broke the meet record, which Moore agreed to.  When Richards arrived, he discovered the meet record was the world record, which he never achieved in his career.

He served as head of the United States Olympic Committee's task force to select a bidding city for the 2012 Summer Olympics.

He was elected into the National Track and Field Hall of Fame as an Event Director in 1988.  In 2007, he was given the Howard Schmertz Lifetime Achievement Award by the U.S. Track Meet Directors Association. 
After his death in 2004, the Modesto Relays was renamed the "Tom Moore Modesto Relays."

References

1914 births
2002 deaths
American male hurdlers
American referees and umpires
Athletics (track and field) officials
California Golden Bears men's track and field athletes
World record setters in athletics (track and field)
Sportspeople from Berkeley, California
Sportspeople from Modesto, California
Track and field athletes from California
Track and field people from California